The Keokuk Bridge, also known as the Keokuk Municipal Bridge, is a double-deck, single-track railway and highway bridge across the Mississippi River in the United States between Keokuk, Iowa, and Hamilton, Illinois, just downstream of Mississippi Lock and Dam number 19. It was designed by Ralph Modjeski and constructed 1915–1916 on the piers of its predecessor that was constructed in 1869–1871.

Following the completion of the Keokuk-Hamilton Bridge, the upper deck of this bridge, on the Keokuk side, was converted to an observation deck to view the nearby lock and dam; this deck is no longer used for road traffic, but the lower deck is still used for rail traffic. The bridge was originally owned by the Keokuk & Hamilton Bridge Company, but following financial problems in the 1940s, the bridge was given to the City of Keokuk in late 1948.

The bridge was originally the western terminus of the Toledo, Peoria & Western Railroad. Today, it serves  the Keokuk Junction Railway with occasional train crossings for interconnection and river terminal services. Only the Keokuk side of the highway bridge has been converted, the bridge's upper highway deck is abandoned. The river traffic (barges and boats) have the right-of-way, so the swing section remains open until a train needs to cross the river.

On the Illinois side of the bridge, two precast concrete barriers prevent auto traffic from driving on to the old highway section.

The bridge was documented as survey number IA-3 by the Historic American Engineering Record, archived in the Library of Congress.

See also
List of crossings of the Upper Mississippi River
List of bridges documented by the Historic American Engineering Record in Illinois
List of bridges documented by the Historic American Engineering Record in Iowa
Lock and Dam No. 19

External links

Keokuk Area Convention and Tourism Bureau - Observation deck
Construction dates and brief history

Railroad bridges in Iowa
Railroad bridges in Illinois
Bridges over the Mississippi River
Road-rail bridges in the United States
Buildings and structures in Keokuk, Iowa
Bridges in Lee County, Iowa
Tourist attractions in Lee County, Iowa
Buildings and structures in Hancock County, Illinois
Road bridges in Illinois
Road bridges in Iowa
Former toll bridges in Illinois
Former toll bridges in Iowa
1916 establishments in Iowa
1916 establishments in Illinois
Bridges completed in 1916
Historic American Engineering Record in Illinois
Historic American Engineering Record in Iowa
Interstate railroad bridges in the United States
Double-decker bridges